Karen Georgievich Shakhnazarov, PAR (born 8 July 1952) is a Soviet and Russian filmmaker, producer and screenwriter. He became the Director General of Mosfilm studios in 1998.

Shakhnazarov is the son of a Georgy Shakhnazarov, a politician of Armenian descent, and a Russian housewife, Anna Grigorievna Shakhnazarova.

His 1987 film Courier was entered into the 15th Moscow International Film Festival, where it won a Special Prize. In 2002 he was a member of the jury at the 24th Moscow International Film Festival. Since 2005 he has been a member of the Public Chamber of Russia.

His 2012 film White Tiger was selected as the Russian entry for the Best Foreign Language Oscar at the 85th Academy Awards, but it did not make the final shortlist.

In March 2014 he signed a letter in support of the position of the President of Russia Vladimir Putin on the situation in Ukraine and Crimea. For this he was banned from entering Ukraine.

On 10 March 2022, during a broadcast on Russia-1, Shakhnazarov, who initially supported the 2022 Russian invasion of Ukraine, called for an end to it, saying that the situation was at risk of becoming "an absolute humanitarian disaster", and that there is no realistic possibility for the Russian forces to seize Kyiv and other major Ukrainian cities.

Selected filmography

Genealogy
Karen Shakhnazarov is one of several living descendants of the famous Melik-Shahnazarian princely family from Nagorno-Karabakh. The Melik-Shahnazarians ruled Nagorno-Karabakh's province of Varanda in medieval and modern times.

References

External links

Karen Shakhnazarov, born in the USSR (biography)

1952 births
Living people
Russian people of Armenian descent
Russian film directors
Soviet film directors
People from Krasnodar
Members of the Civic Chamber of the Russian Federation
Academicians of the National Academy of Motion Picture Arts and Sciences of Russia
Mosfilm